Jock Climie is a Canadian retired Canadian Football League player who played the slotback position primarily with the Ottawa Rough Riders, and Montreal Alouettes. He is also a former sportscaster with Canadian sports television channel TSN as part of the CFL on TSN studio panel during the CFL season. Climie is currently a labour and employment lawyer at the Ottawa law firm of Emond Harnden.

College career
While attending Queen's University, Climie played university football for the Queen's Golden Gaels. His 1,091 receiving yards in 1988 was at the time the single-season record for Canadian university football; it has since been broken, first by Don Blair (University of Calgary), then by Andy Fantuz (University of Western Ontario); Fantuz played one more game during his college career. Climie was the OQIFC conference's nominee for outstanding national player in 1988. He was inducted into the Queen's Football Hall of Fame. He earned his law degree at Queen's by attending its winter academic sessions while playing CFL football in the summer and fall, taking six terms over six years to graduate.

Professional career
Following his outstanding college career, Climie was drafted fourth overall in the 1990 CFL Draft by the Toronto Argonauts. He dressed for the first two games of the season, but was then relegated to the practice roster. Soon after, he was signed by the Ottawa Rough Riders and would go on to play in 62 games for the franchise while also being named a CFL East All-Star in 1993. Climie re-signed with the Argonauts in 1995 and then signed with the newly reborn Montreal Alouettes in 1996. That year, he was again named a CFL East All-Star and he repeated the feat in 1997, while also being awarded the Lew Hayman Trophy as the top Canadian player in the CFL's East Division. Climie finished his career as an Alouette in 2001, having recorded 627 catches for 9619 yards and 56 touchdowns and finishing in the top 20 in receiving yardage at the time of his retirement.

Statistics

References

External links
Emond Harnden (law firm) Biography Page - Jock Climie
TSN Talent Page - Jock Climie

Living people
Canadian Football League announcers
Canadian football slotbacks
Canadian television sportscasters
Lawyers in Ontario
Black Canadian lawyers
Montreal Alouettes players
Ottawa Rough Riders players
Canadian football people from Toronto
Players of Canadian football from Ontario
Queen's University at Kingston alumni
Queen's Golden Gaels football players
Toronto Argonauts players
Queen's University Faculty of Law alumni
1968 births